Penicillium decumbens is an anamorph species of the genus of Penicillium which occurs widespread in nature, mainly in subtropical and tropical soil but it also occur in food. Analysis have shown that Penicillium decumbens has antibiotic activity Penicillium decumbens produces the cyclopentenone cyclopenicillone

Further reading

See also
 List of Penicillium species

References 

decumbens
Fungi described in 1910